Plesiosauroidea (Greek:   'near, close to' and   'lizard') is an extinct clade of carnivorous marine reptiles. They have the snake-like longest neck to body ratio of any reptile. Plesiosauroids are known from the Jurassic and Cretaceous periods. After their discovery, some plesiosauroids were said to have resembled "a snake threaded through the shell of a turtle", although they had no shell.

Plesiosauroidea appeared at the Early Jurassic Period (late Sinemurian stage) and thrived until the K-Pg extinction, at the end of the Cretaceous Period. The oldest confirmed plesiosauroid is Plesiosaurus itself, as all younger taxa were recently found to be pliosauroids. While they were Mesozoic diapsid reptiles that lived at the same time as dinosaurs, they did not belong to the latter. Gastroliths are frequently found associated with plesiosaurs.

History of discovery

The first complete plesiosauroid skeletons were found in England by Mary Anning, in the early 19th century, and were amongst the first fossil vertebrates to be described by science. Plesiosauroid remains were found by the Scottish geologist Hugh Miller in 1844 in the rocks of the Great Estuarine Group (then known as 'Series') of western Scotland. Many others have been found, some of them virtually complete, and new discoveries are made frequently. One of the finest specimens was found in 2002 on the coast of Somerset (England) by someone fishing from the shore. This specimen, called the Collard specimen after its finder, was on display in Taunton Museum in 2007. Another, less complete, skeleton was also found in 2002, in the cliffs at Filey, Yorkshire, England, by an amateur palaeontologist. The preserved skeleton is displayed at Rotunda Museum in Scarborough.

Description

Plesiosauroids had a broad body and a short tail. They retained their ancestral two pairs of limbs, which evolved into large flippers.

It has been determined by teeth records that several sea-dwelling reptiles, including plesiosauroids, had a warm-blooded metabolism similar to that of mammals. They could generate endothermic heat to survive in colder habitats.

Evolution
Plesiosauroids evolved from earlier, similar forms such as pistosaurs. There are a number of families of plesiosauroids, which retain the same general appearance and are distinguished by various specific details. These include the Plesiosauridae, unspecialized types which are limited to the Early Jurassic period;  Cryptoclididae, (e.g. Cryptoclidus), with a medium-long neck and somewhat stocky build; Elasmosauridae, with very long, flexible necks and tiny heads; and the Cimoliasauridae, a poorly known group of small Cretaceous forms. According to traditional classifications, all plesiosauroids have a small head and long neck but, in recent classifications, one short-necked and large-headed Cretaceous group, the Polycotylidae, are included under the Plesiosauroidea, rather than under the traditional Pliosauroidea. Size of different plesiosaurs varied significantly, with an estimated length of Trinacromerum being three meters and Mauisaurus growing to twenty meters.

Relationships

The following cladogram follows an analysis by Benson & Druckenmiller (2014).

Behavior

Unlike their pliosauroid cousins, plesiosauroids (with the exception of the Polycotylidae) were probably slow swimmers. It is likely that they cruised slowly below the surface of the water, using their long flexible neck to move their head into position to snap up unwary fish or cephalopods. Their four-flippered swimming adaptation may have given them exceptional maneuverability, so that they could swiftly rotate their bodies as an aid to catching prey.

Contrary to many reconstructions of plesiosauroids, it would have been impossible for them to lift their head and long neck above the surface, in the "swan-like" pose that is often shown. Even if they had been able to bend their necks upward to that degree (which they could not), gravity would have tipped their body forward and kept most of the heavy neck in the water.

On 12 August 2011, researchers from the U.S. described a fossil of a pregnant plesiosaur found on a Kansas ranch in 1987. The plesiosauroid, Polycotylus latippinus, has confirmed that these predatory marine reptiles gave birth to single, large, live offspring—contrary to other marine reptile reproduction which typically involves a large number of small babies. Before this study, plesiosauroids had sometimes been portrayed crawling out of water to lay eggs in the manner of sea turtles, but experts had long suspected that their anatomy was not compatible with movement on land.

References

Sources

Carpenter, K. 1997. "Comparative cranial anatomy of two North American Cretaceous plesiosaurs". Pp. 91–216, in Calloway J. M. and E. L. Nicholls, (eds.), Ancient Marine Reptiles, Academic Press, San Diego.

Ellis, R. 2003. Sea Dragons (Kansas University Press)

Everhart, M. J. 2005. "Where the Elasmosaurs roamed", Chapter 7 in Oceans of Kansas: A Natural History of the Western Interior Sea, Indiana University Press, Bloomington, 322 p.
Everhart, M. J. 2005. "Gastroliths associated with plesiosaur remains in the Sharon Springs Member (Late Cretaceous) of the Pierre Shale, Western Kansas" (on-line, updated from article in Kansas Acad. Sci. Trans. 103(1-2):58-69)

Everhart, M. J. 2007. Sea Monsters: Prehistoric Creatures of the Deep. National Geographic, 192 p. .
Everhart, M. J. "Marine Reptile References" and scans of "Early papers on North American plesiosaurs"
Hampe, O., 1992: Courier Forsch.-Inst. Senckenberg 145: 1-32.

Massare, J. A. 1994. Swimming capabilities of Mesozoic marine reptiles: a review. pp. 133–149 In Maddock, L., Bone, Q., and Rayner, J. M. V. (eds.), Mechanics and Physiology of Animal Swimming, Cambridge University Press.
Smith, A. S. 2008. Fossils explained 54: plesiosaurs. Geology Today. 24, (2), 71-75 PDF document on the Plesiosaur Directory
Storrs, G. W., 1999. An examination of Plesiosauria (Diapsida: Sauropterygia) from the Niobrara Chalk (Upper Cretaceous) of central North America, University of Kansas Paleontological Contributions, (N.S.), No. 11, 15 pp.
Welles, S. P. 1943. Elasmosaurid plesiosaurs with a description of the new material from California and Colorado. University of California Memoirs 13:125-254. figs. 1-37., pls. 12–29.
Welles, S. P. 1952. A review of the North American Cretaceous elasmosaurs. University of California Publications in Geological Science 29:46-144, figs. 1-25.
Welles, S. P. 1962. A new species of elasmosaur from the Aptian of Columbia and a review of the Cretaceous plesiosaurs. University of California Publications in Geological Science 46,  96 pp.

, 2 fig.
Williston, S. W. 1902. Restoration of Dolichorhynchops osborni, a new Cretaceous plesiosaur. Kansas University Science Bulletin, 1(9):241-244, 1 plate.
Williston, S. W. 1903. North American plesiosaurs. Field Columbian Museum, Publication 73, Geology Series 2(1): 1-79, 29 pl.
, 4 pl.

, 1997: in Reports of the National Center for Science Education, 17.3''' (May/June 1997) pp 16–28.

External links
Fox News: Possibly Complete Plesiosaur Skeleton Found in Arctic
 The Plesiosaur Site. Richard Forrest.
 The Plesiosaur Directory. Dr Adam Stuart Smith.
 The name game: plesiosaur-ia, -oidea, -idae, or -us?.
 Oceans of Kansas Paleontology. Mike Everhart.
 Where the elasmosaurs roam: Separating fact from fiction. Mike Everhart.
 Triassic reptiles had live youngThe Filey (Yorkshire) Plesiosaur 2002 (part 1)
The Filey (Yorkshire) Plesiosaur 2002 (part 2)
 Antarctic Researchers to Discuss Difficult Recovery of Unique Juvenile Plesiosaur Fossil, from the National Science Foundation, December 6, 2006.
 "Fossil hunters turn up 50-ton monster of prehistoric deep". Allan Hall and Mark Henderson. Times Online'', December 30, 2002. (Monster of Aramberri)

Plesiosaurs
Fossil taxa described in 1825
Taxa named by John Edward Gray
Pliensbachian first appearances
Maastrichtian extinctions